Danial Nielsen Frost (born 18 October 2001 in Singapore) is a Singaporean race car driver. He currently competes in Indy NXT driving for HMD Motorsports with Dale Coyne Racing.

Career
Frost began his racing career in the 2016–17 Formula 4 South East Asia Championship. In 2017 he moved to the Formula Masters China and finished in 3rd place. In 2017–18 he made his debut in the MRF Challenge Formula 2000 Championship. In 2018 he competed in the U.S. F2000 National Championship with Exclusive Autosport, and in 2019 he moved to the Indy Pro 2000 Championship, the second step on the Road to Indy.

In 2020, Frost signed with Andretti Autosport. In the following year, Frost switched to HMD Motorsports with Dale Coyne Racing.

Following his season in 2022 Indy Lights for HMD Motorsports w/ Dale Coyne Racing, Frost tested one of the team's cars in October 2022 in a private IndyCar driver evaluation test at Sebring.

Frost re-signed with HMD Motorsports w/ Dale Coyne Racing for the 2023 Indy Lights championship. He won the season-opening Indy NXT by Grand Prix of St. Petersburg on Sunday, 5 March 2023, earning his second career victory in IndyCar’s development series.

Racing record

Career summary

* Season still in progress.

American open–wheel racing results

U.S. F2000 Championship

Indy Pro 2000 Championship

Indy Lights/Indy NXT
(key) (Races in bold indicate pole position) (Races in italics indicate fastest lap) (Races with L indicate a race lap led) (Races with * indicate most race laps led)

* Season still in progress.

Complete WeatherTech SportsCar Championship results 
(key) (Races in bold indicate pole position; races in italics indicate fastest lap)

References

External links
 Danial Frost
  

2001 births
Living people
Singaporean racing drivers
U.S. F2000 National Championship drivers
MRF Challenge Formula 2000 Championship drivers
Indy Pro 2000 Championship drivers
Indy Lights drivers
Formula Masters China drivers
Formula Regional Americas Championship drivers
Asian Le Mans Series drivers
Andretti Autosport drivers
Dale Coyne Racing drivers
Team Meritus drivers
Eurasia Motorsport drivers
Japanese F4 Championship drivers
Danish F4 Championship drivers
HMD Motorsports drivers
WeatherTech SportsCar Championship drivers